There have been two baronetcies created for members of the Cochrane family, both in the Baronetage of the United Kingdom. One creation is extant.

The Cochrane baronetcy, of Woodbrook, Old Connaught, in Bray in the County of Wicklow, of Lisgar Castle in Bailieborough in the County of Cavan, and of Kildare Street in the City of Dublin, was created in the Baronetage of the United Kingdom on 8 October 1903 for Sir Henry Cochrane, governing director of Cantrell and Cochrane, mineral water manufacturers, of Dublin, and an alderman of that city for many years. His second but eldest-surviving son, the second baronet, was a dramatist. He was succeeded by his second son, the third baronet, in 1952. The fourth baronet succeeded his father in 1979.

The Cochrane baronetcy, of Woodbrook in Bray in the County of Wicklow, was created in the baronetage of the United Kingdom on 10 February 1915 for Stanley Cochrane to honour his services to cricket and music. He was the third and youngest son of the first baronet of the 1903 creation (see above) and was involved in the family mineral water manufacturing business. Cochrane never married, and the title became extinct upon his death in October 1949.

Cochrane baronets, of Woodbrook, Lisgar Castle and Kildare Street (1903)
Sir Henry Cochrane, Kt., 1st Baronet (1836–1904)
Sir Ernest Cecil Cochrane, 2nd Baronet (1873–1952)
Sir Desmond Oriel Alastair George Weston Cochrane, 3rd Baronet (1918–1979)
Sir (Henry) Marc Sursock Cochrane, 4th Baronet (born 1946)

Cochrane baronets, of Woodbrook (1915)
Sir Stanley Herbert Cochrane, 1st Baronet (1877–1949)

References

Kidd, Charles, Williamson, David (editors). Debrett's Peerage and Baronetage (1990 edition). New York: St Martin's Press, 1990.

External links

Biography of Sir Stanley Cochrane, 1st Baronet, at irishgolfarchive.com

Baronetcies in the Baronetage of the United Kingdom
Extinct baronetcies in the Baronetage of the United Kingdom
Baronets